František Hojer (27 April 1896 – 16 December 1940) was a Czechoslovak footballer. He played 5 games for the Czechoslovakia national football team. Hojer represented Czechoslovakia at the 1924 Olympics together with his older brother Antonín.

References

1896 births
1940 deaths
Czech footballers
Czechoslovak footballers
Czechoslovakia international footballers
FK Viktoria Žižkov players
SK Slavia Prague players
Olympic footballers of Czechoslovakia
Footballers at the 1924 Summer Olympics
Association football defenders
Footballers from Prague
People from the Kingdom of Bohemia